For the Australian politician, see John Hindle.

John A. Hindle (November 1934 – 2012) was a British property developer and Olympic Games hockey player.

Early life
Hindle was born on 20 November 1934.

Hockey career
Hindle played hockey for Great Britain at the 1960 and 1964 Olympic Games. Great Britain came fourth in 1960, so he missed out on a medal.

Business career
Hindle was a Director of Brookhouse Properties from 1996 to 2012. In 2005, the Sunday Times estimated his net worth at GBP£102 million.

Personal life and death
Hindle resided in Sale, Greater Manchester. He had a daughter, Emma Hindle, an equestrian who has competed for Great Britain in Dressage at both the Athens and Beijing Olympic Games. Hindle died in 2012, and Emma now runs his property business.

References

External links
 

1934 births
2012 deaths
People from Sale, Greater Manchester
British businesspeople
British male field hockey players
Olympic field hockey players of Great Britain
Field hockey players at the 1960 Summer Olympics
Field hockey players at the 1964 Summer Olympics